Grenville South was a federal electoral district represented in the House of Commons of Canada from 1867 to 1904. It was located in the province of Ontario. It was created by the British North America Act of 1867.

The electoral district was abolished in 1903 when it was merged into Grenville riding.

Election results

|}

|}

|}

|}

|}

On Mr. Benson's death, 8 June 1885:

|}

|}

|}

|}

|}

See also 

 List of Canadian federal electoral districts
 Past Canadian electoral districts

References

External links 
Riding history from the Library of Parliament

Former federal electoral districts of Ontario